Ngantungane Gisborne James Punivai (born 30 August 1998, in New Zealand) is a New Zealand rugby union player who plays for the  in Super Rugby. His playing position is wing. Punivai attended Christ's College in Christchurch, where he was captain of the 1st XV and the deputy head prefect. He has signed for the Crusaders squad in 2019. Punivai scored his first try for the Highlanders against his former team, the Crusaders on 4 July 2020

Reference list

External links
itsrugby.co.uk profile

1998 births
New Zealand rugby union players
Living people
Rugby union wings
Rugby union centres
Canterbury rugby union players
Crusaders (rugby union) players
Highlanders (rugby union) players
Rugby union players from Lower Hutt
Chiefs (rugby union) players